McCary is a surname. Notable people with the surname include:

Abigail McCary (born 1982), American beauty queen
Dave McCary (born 1985), American filmmaker
Michael McCary (born 1971), American singer
William McCary ( 1811–after 1854), American Latter Day Saint

See also
McCarey